Četvrtkovac is a village in central Croatia, in the municipality of Sunja, Sisak-Moslavina County. It is located in the Banija region.

Demographics
According to the 2011 census, the village of Četvrtkovac has 232 inhabitants. This represents 45.58% of its pre-war population.
According to the 1991 census, 88.02% of the village population were ethnic Serbs (448/509).

Note: The 1869 data is reported under the Drljača settlement while the 1880 data includes data for the Drljača settlement.

Notable natives and residents

References 

Populated places in Sisak-Moslavina County